Rebecca Marino was the defending champion, but chose not to participate. 
Varvara Lepchenko won the title by defeating Romina Oprandi in the final 6–4, 6–1.

Seeds

Main draw

Finals

Top half

Bottom half

References
 Main Draw
 Qualifying Draw

Q Hotel and Spa Women's Pro Tennis Classic - Singles